Spice cake is a type of cake that is traditionally flavored with a mixture of spices.  The cake can be prepared in many varieties. Predominant flavorings include spices such as cinnamon, cloves, allspice, ginger, and nutmeg.

Variations
A maple spice cake is an American variation that adds maple syrup or maple flavoring. The recipe was a New Hampshire specialty that started in the beginning of the 19th century. It often tastes like cinnamon or apple cider, and is a fall classic.

See also
List of cakes

References

Cakes